Sulayman Al-Bassam, (1 June 1972), is a Kuwaiti playwright and theatre director, and founder of Zaoum theatre company  (London 1996-2001) and its Arabic arm Sulayman Al-Bassam Theatre Kuwait (2002).

From The Royal Shakespeare Company in the UK to Peter Brook's legendary theatre in Paris, from Japan to the US, the work of Sulayman Al-Bassam and his troupe SABAB Theatre has been celebrated across four continents by the world's most prestigious cultural powerhouses. Led by Kuwaiti writer & director Sulayman Al-Bassam and British producer Georgina Van Welie, working alongside artists from across the Arab World and Europe, the company is a celebration of cultural diversity in an age of extremes.

Its projects are  characterised by a radical approach to text (new writing and re-workings of Shakespeare), bold production styles and an uncompromising engagement with issues concerning the
contemporary Arab world. Over the last four years the company has created a string of internationally acclaimed productions including The Al-Hamlet Summit, Kalila wa Dimna, The Mirror For Princes, Melting The Ice, Trading, Richard 3, an Arab Tragedy.

Sulayman Al-Bassam's work, though deeply critical of political structures and regressive forces within the Arab world, challenges the negative preconceptions surrounding Arab and Muslim society today. It champions the Arab voice internationally and creates an intercultural space for Arab culture on the world stage. In 2013, Al Bassam was commissioned by La Comedie Francaise to direct the first text of an Arab author to take a place in the permanent repertoire of the company, Saadallah Wannous' Rituel pour one Metamorphose.

Bibliography
 Al-Bassam, Sulayman. 2006. The Al-Hamlet Summit University of Hertfordshire Press. .
 Al-Bassam, Sulayman. 2006. The Mirror for Princes: Kalila Wa Dimna London: Oberon Books Ltd. .

External links
 Al-Bassam Theatre and Zaoum— official sites
 Transcript of Al-Bassam in interview on BBC Radio 3's "Night Waves"

1972 births
Living people
English dramatists and playwrights
English male dramatists and playwrights